Kari or KARI may refer to:

Places
Kari, Jhunjhunu, a village in Rajasthan, India
 , a village in Mouhoun Province, Burkina Faso
Kari, Tikamgarh, a town in Madhya Pradesh, India
Kari, Iran, a village in Bushehr Province, Iran
Kari-ye Bozorg ("Greater Kari"), a village in Ardabil Province, Iran

People and languages
The Gayiri people of central Queensland, Australia
Kari people, also Cari, Aka-Kari or Aka-Cari, a tribe in the Andaman Islands, India
Kari language, also Cari, Aka-Kari or Aka-Cari, spoken by the Kari people
Kari language, a Bantu language spoken in Africa
Kari (name), real and fictional people with the given name, nickname or surname
Kari Suomalainen
Kári, son of Fornjót, the personification of wind in Norse mythology

Organisations
KARI (AM), an AM radio station broadcasting on 550, licensed to Blaine, WA
Kenya Agricultural Research Institute
Kleptocracy Asset Recovery Initiative
Korea Aerospace Research Institute

Other
 Kari or curry, a pan-Asian variety of dishes made of spices and/or herbs
 Kari Motor Speedway, Coimbatore
Kari (moon), a natural satellite of Saturn
Kari (music), a technique in shakuhachi music
Karo-kari, a local term for honour killing in Pakistan
, more than one Imperial Japanese Navy ship

See also

Karie (disambiguation)
Karri (disambiguation)